Caroline Emma "Carissa" Springett is a Thai actress and model. She is best known for portraying Beatriz "Blair" Waranon in Gossip Girl: Thailand.

Early life and education 
Springett was born on 2 March 1998, to an English father and a Thai mother. She graduated from Piboonbumpen Demonstration School's International Education Program (IEP) and received a bachelor's degree from the College of Social Communication Innovation, Srinakharinwirot University in 2020.

Career 
Springett entered the entertainment industry through modeling, starting her career in 2015 as a contestant in The Face Thailand, where she was eliminated in the 10th round. She later starred in Gossip Girl: Thailand as Beatriz "Blair" Waranon, one of the main characters, for which she was awarded the Female Rising Star award at Daw Mekhla Awards.

Filmography

Television

Film

MC
 Online 
 2021 : EP.1 (อย่างเป็นทางการ) On Air YouTube:Carissa Springett

Awards

References

External links 
 

Carissa Springett
Living people
1998 births
Carissa Springett
Carissa Springett
Carissa Springett
Carissa Springett
Carissa Springett
Carissa Springett
Carissa Springett
Carissa Springett
Carissa Springett
Carissa Springett
Carissa Springett